is a river in Yamagata Prefecture, Japan. It flows into the Sea of Japan.

Soccer fields  on Akagawa riverbed 
There are football fields on Akagawa riverbed in Tsuruoka, and they were NEC Yamagata SC's practice grounds.

References

Rivers of Yamagata Prefecture
Rivers of Japan
Tsuruoka, Yamagata
Montedio Yamagata